The Long Island Music and Entertainment Hall of Fame was incorporated in July 2005 under the New York State Board of Regents, as a nonprofit organization and holds a provisional charter to operate as a museum in the state of New York. It recognizes musicians, music executives, and other music and entertainment professionals who have contributed to the musical and entertainment heritage of Long Island through Induction Ceremonies held every 2 years since 2006.  Inductees are selected by a committee that determines their eligibility through their contributions and time living and performing within the geographic area of Long Island, which includes Brooklyn, Queens, Nassau and Suffolk Counties.
 
One of the organization’s primary missions is to support local education. It has distributed tens of thousands of dollars in scholarships to Long Island High School Seniors, gives annual Educator of Note Awards to deserving educators, and hosts concerts where high school bands and orchestras perform with LIMEHOF inductees.
 
The organization opened the Long Island Music and Entertainment Hall of Fame and Museum in November, 2022 in Stony Brook, NY. The ribbon cutting ceremony was performed by Ernie Canadeo, Chairman, and the board of directors of the organization, local government officials, and the board of the Ward Melville Heritage Organization, the landlord of the property. The 8800 square foot building includes a museum of Long Island music history celebrating its over 120 Inductees,  memorabilia, photographs and videos, a rotating exhibit the first of which is “Long Island’s Legendary Club Scene – 1960’s-80’s, a surround sound theater, and 2 stages for musical performances and speaker presentations. 
 
Its presenting sponsor is Catholic Health, a prominent Long Island health care system, and a program entitled Health and Harmony will be launched in 2023, exploring and cultivating the relationship between music and health and wellness.

2006 Inductees
Ron Alexenburg
Mose Allison
Sam Ash
Tony Bennett
Gary U.S. Bonds
Harry Chapin
George M. Cohan
John Coltrane
Perry Como
James (Jimmy) D'Aquisto
Debbie Gibson
George Gershwin
Richie Havens
Joan Jett
Billy Joel
Cyndi Lauper
Little Anthony and the Imperials
Long Island Philharmonic
 Edward "Little Buster" Forehand
The Brooklyn Bridge
Marian McPartland
George "Shadow" Morton
Run-DMC
Neil Sedaka
Gene Simmons
Paul Stanley
Peter Criss
Stray Cats
Stony Brook University
Sam "Bluzman" Taylor
Twisted Sister
Vanilla Fudge
Leslie West

2008 Inductees
The second induction ceremony was held at The Garden City Hotel in Garden City, New York, on October 30, 2008.

Louis Armstrong
Count Basie
Walter Becker
Pat Benatar
Blue Öyster Cult
Bob Buchmann
Mariah Carey
Aaron Copland
Neil Diamond
The Good Rats
Arlo Guthrie
Marvin Hamlisch
Carole King
LL Cool J
Guy Lombardo
Eddie Money
Public Enemy
The Ramones
Jean Ritchie
Beverly Sills
Simon and Garfunkel
Barbra Streisand
The Tokens
Kenny Vance

2010 Inductees
The third induction ceremony was held at Oheka Castle in West Hills on November 16, 2010.
Dream Theater
Rakim
Lou Reed
Eric B
Eddie Palmeri
Donnie McClurkin
My Father's Place
Denis McNamara
Teddy Charles
Morton Gould
Roy Haynes
Al Kooper
Steve Martin - agent
The Shangri-Las
Bob Gruen
Oscar Brand
The Magic Garden'''s Carole Demas & Paula Janis
John Zorn

2012 Inductees
The fourth induction ceremony was held at The Paramount in Huntington on October 18, 2012.

Ellie Greenwich
Suffocation
The Lovin' Spoonful
Randy Weston
Ervin Drake
Leo Kraft
Zebra
Stanley Drucker
Barnaby Bye
Connie Stevens
CSS Security Services
Jones Beach Theater
Salt-N-Pepa
Taylor Dayne
The Thunderbird Sisters and the Shinnecock Indian Nation
Walk 97.5
Whodini

2014 Inductees
The fifth induction ceremony took place at the Paramount in Huntington on October 23, 2014.

Doug Stegmeyer (posthumously)''
Liberty DeVitto
Richie Cannata
Clive Davis
Gerry Goffin
Kurtis Blow
Ron Delsener
Steve Thompson
Russell Javors

2016 Inductees
The 2016 Induction ceremony took place on Thursday, November 3 at The Space at Westbury.

Big Daddy Kane
Charles Koppelman
Carter Burwell
Garland Jeffreys
Sandy Pearlman 
Santo & Johnny
Jim Steinman 
Steve Vai
Vince Giordano
Westbury Music Fair
Steven Van Zandt was presented the 2016 Harry Chapin Award for his dedication to music education on Long Island and across the nation.

2018 Inductees
Jon Bauman
EPMD
Good Times Magazine
Michael Lang
Melanie
Artie Kornfeld
Brucie Morrow
Elliott Murphy
Seymour Stein
Taking Back Sunday
Jimmy Webb
Tommy Byrnes
Wayne Robins

See also
 List of music museums

References

External links
Long Island Music Hall of Fame
 "What's the Long Island Sound?" Jimmy Webb, The New York Times, November 6, 2006
 "Clive Davis, Billy Joel's Band Among Long Island Music Hall of Fame Inductees" Daniel Kreps, Rolling Stone Magazine, October 16, 2014

Music halls of fame
Halls of fame in New York (state)
Long Island
Organizations established in 2005
Proposed museums in the United States
Proposed buildings and structures in New York (state)